Albion Park is a suburb situated in the Macquarie Valley in the City of Shellharbour, which is in turn one of the three local government areas that comprise the Wollongong Metropolitan Area, New South Wales, Australia.

The Illawarra escarpment is to the west, Dapto is to the north, Jamberoo is to the south and Shellharbour is to the east.

History 
On 9 January 1821 the area around Albion Park was part of a grant of land of over 2000 acres given to Samuel Terry, a former convict who became one of the richest men in New South Wales. Terry owned and operated the Terry's Meadows Estate, which operated as a cattle stud. In 1834, Terry suffered from a stroke and died in 1838.

The land was inherited by Samuel Terry's nephew, John Terry Hughes. Hughes renamed the site to Albion Park.

The township began to grow around the centre of the estate. For European settlers, this had been a natural meeting place as it was where the road from Wollongong in the north crossed the road from the timber industry in Calderwood and Tongarra in the west as it ran out towards the port at Shellharbour.

The arrival of the railway line in 1887, and the completion of the road through Macquarie Pass to the Southern Highlands, hastened the town's growth.

Heritage listings 
Albion Park has a number of heritage-listed sites, including:
 Tullimbar Road: Toongla

Etymology 
The term "Albion" is an ancient name of Great Britain.  The name was given to the area by John Terry Hughes after originally being known as the Terry's Meadow Estate.

Population
According to the 2021 census of Population, there were 13,826 people in Albion Park.
 Aboriginal and Torres Strait Islander people made up 4.5% of the population. 
 84.1% of people were born in Australia. The next most common countries of birth were England 4.2%, New Zealand 0.8%,  Scotland 0.6% and Germany 0.6%.   
 90.4% of people only spoke English at home. 
 The most common responses for religion were No Religion 39.0%, Catholic 24.3%, and Anglican 17.2%.

Infrastructure

Trains 
In order to avoid the highest parts of the ridge between Albion Park and Minnamurra, the railway needed to keep closer to the shore of Lake Illawarra. After the opening of Albion Park railway station two km to the east in 1887, a new town began to develop next to it, now known as Albion Park Rail.

Roads 
The Illawarra Highway runs through Albion Park and joins the Princes Highway just north of the suburb. This road brings many people through the region. Albion Park is also on the most direct link between Jamberoo Action Park and Sydney via the Princes Motorway and thus is directly on the route for those travelling south.

Education 
There are currently 4 Primary Schools and 3 High Schools in Albion Park:
 Albion Park Public School
 Albion Park High School
 Mount Terry Public School
 St. Joseph's Catholic School, Albion Park
 St. Paul's Catholic Primary School, Albion Park
 Illawarra Christian School (Tongarra Campus)
 Tullimbar Primary school

Recreation 
Albion Park is home to the Shellharbour Regional Sporting Complex, which consists of two all-weather hockey fields, several football (rugby league) fields, a multi-purpose indoor basketball stadium, a turf cricket / AFL field, an athletics field, a BMX track, a  remote control car racing track, and several tennis courts. A cycleway also courses its way through the Sporting Complex and links it to a polo field and a complex of soccer fields. Albion Park is also home to a Shellharbour Council Swimming Pool, which is open during the summer months and now costs a fee of $2.00 entry, to a pool paid for by the members of the town.

Clubs and pubs 
Albion Park is home to three clubs where people go to eat and drink. They include:
 Albion Park Hotel
 Albion Park RSL
 Albion Park Bowls and Recreation Club

Sport 
Albion Park is also home to various sporting teams such as:
 Albion Park-Oak Flats Eagles
 Albion Park Hockey Club
 Albion Park Bowls and Recreation Club
 Albion Park Cows Football Club
 Albion Park Cricket Club
 Albion Park White Eagles
 Albion Park Crows Junior AFL Club

Museums 
Albion Park has the Tongarra Museum, which showcases the history of the region, and the Historical Aircraft Restoration Society Museum located at the Illawarra Regional Airport.

Commercial area 
There is a small Vicinity Centres shopping complex in Albion Park.
In 2009, the local Council started a program to revitalize the town centre and it has attracted more tourists to the town.

References

External links

City of Shellharbour
Suburbs of Wollongong